The Executive Council of Nunavut or cabinet includes a Premier and eight Ministers and is elected by the members of the Legislative Assembly from among the Assembly members.

The cabinet members provide the political direction and accountability for each function, while the Deputy Minister of each department is appointed position with responsibility to guide and manage the daily administration of the budgets and programs of government.

As of November 2021, the current ministers are:

References

 
Nunavut
Politics of Nunavut
Government of Nunavut